Bernardas Bučas  (1903–1979) was a Lithuanian painter, sculptor, and graphicer. Amongst his works are the statue Agriculture on the Green Bridge in Vilnius.

See also
List of Lithuanian painters

References
This article was initially translated from the Lithuanian Wikipedia.

1903 births
1979 deaths
20th-century Lithuanian painters
People from Kovno Governorate
People from Panevėžys District Municipality